The Velthen Company, called Velthenska sällskapet in Sweden, and Hochdeutsche Hofcomödianten in Germany, was a travelling German Theatre Company, active in Germany, Poland, the Baltic and the Scandinavian countries of Denmark, Norway and Sweden between 1678 and 1712. The company played a vital role in the theater history of Scandinavia, where a local theater was not yet developed and where it toured from at least the 1690s onward: in 1707, it became the first professional theater to have performed in Norway.

History
The company was founded by Johannes Velten upon is marriage in 1678, from the theater company Hochdeutsche Hofcomödianten, which was previously led by his father-in-law. The company had a monopoly in Saxony, and was regarded as one of the best in Germany.

Upon the death of Velthen in 1692, the theater company was taken over by his widow Catharina Elisabeth Velten. In 1694-95, the company toured Germany, Poland and the Baltic. Its whereabouts in 1695-97 is unconfirmed, but it is possibly this company that performed in Copenhagen and Stockholm at that time.
In 1697, the Saxon monopoly of the company was repelled. From 1700 onward, the Velthen Company toured between Vienna, Frankfurt, Copenhagen, Norway, Stockholm and Riga. Between 1707 and 1710, they toured all the Nordic countries and performed in Copenhagen in Denmark and in Bergen and Oslo in Norway: in Norway, they became the likely first professional theater to have performed. 
At the time of their visit in Norway, their cast were composed by Denner the Elder and Denner the Younger, Elisabet Denner Big Müller, Little Müller, Dorseus and Johann Christian Spiegelberg, and their repertoire included plays by Corneille and Molière. 
 
When Velthen retired to settle in Vienna in 1712, the Velthen theater company was dissolved. However, the former members formed a new theater company under the leadership of one of the actors, Johann Christian Spiegelberg (died 1732), which was managed by his widow Elisabet Denner after his death, and which was also active in Germany and Scandinavia.

 Directors 
 1678-1692: Johannes Velten
 1692-1712: Catharina Elisabeth Velten

References

 Dahlberg, Gunilla (1992). Komediantteatern i 1600-talets Stockholm. Stockholm: Komm. för Stockholmsforskning. 
 H.J. Huitfeldt: Christiania Theaterhistorie sid. 35-37 (1876)
 Wilhelm Berg: Anteckningar om Göteborgs äldre teatrar / Band 1. 1690-1794 (1896-1900)
 http://saebi.isgv.de/biografie/Catharina_Velten_(gest._nach_1712) 
 Katy Schlegel, Velten (Velthen, Velthemin, Veltheim), Catharina Elisabeth, in: Sächsische Biografie, hrsg. vom Institut für Sächsische Geschichte und Volkskunde e.V., bearb. von Martina Schattkowsky, Online-Ausgabe: http://www.isgv.de/saebi/ (31.1.2015)

17th century in Norway
18th century in Norway
17th century in the Holy Roman Empire
18th century in the Holy Roman Empire
17th century in Sweden
18th century in Sweden
German comedy troupes
1678 establishments in the Holy Roman Empire
Theatre companies in Germany